Thirumudi N. Sethuraman (24 January 1923 - 23 December 1979) was an Indian politician. He participated in the Indian independence movement. In 1946, he made a turning point in the history of the freedom movement in Puducherry (then called Pondicherry) by forming the French India National Congress along with J. Savarinathan, Ambadi Narayanan, Govinda Pathar and M. A. Annamalai. It was succeeded by French India Students Congress. He is often called as T. N. Sethuraman Chettiar by the affectionate people.
He served as the Deputy Mayor of Pondicherry. In 1967, he was elected as the Member of Parliament from Puducherry (Lok Sabha constituency). He ran again in 1971, but lost to Mohan Kumaramangalam.

He was a scholar and a great philanthropist. He was a man of simplicity. He was the political guru for many of the present politicians of Puducherry.

To honor him, a street was named after him.

Early life

Thirumudi N. Sethuraman was born in Puducherry to Nataraja Chettiar and Kusalambal Ammaiyar on 24 January 1923. His parents believed that he was born by the grace of Lord at Rameswaram after his elder brother died at the age of 4. He was actually named 'Sethu Ramasamy' on the belief of the news that there was Sethu Dam built by Lord Ram in Rameswaram. Later he was called 'Sethuraman' and 'Thirumudi' is his family name. He had a younger brother named 'Velmurugan' and younger sister named 'Rasambal'. Their family lived in the Traditional Chettinad House in Ananda Rangapillai Street of Puducherry where you could feel the presence of Lord Lakshmi and Lord Saraswati.

His family was well known in the city. They were wealthy and famous in Puducherry. His ancestor Arumuga Chettiar and his descendants were in Tharangambadi and was having trade with Dutch. They were into trade of Dye, Tobacco, Soap etc. Their trade expanded to Mauritius. They had farmlands and two Bungalows in Mauritius. They have built a temple for Lord Shiva in Mauritius which is still existing. Later they gave their farmland for lease to 'Helios Malaka Company'. In meanwhile they got contact with French East India Company and shifted to Puducherry where they continued their business. One of them was 'Padangu Narayanasamy Chettiar', a philanthropist who was appreciated by M. Z. Savarayalounayagar in Recueil de chants tamouls.

Favorite Pastime and recreation:  Reading.

Special interests:  Archaeology, collection of antiquities.

Travels abroad:  Ceylon, U.S.S.R., Japan, Indonesia, Norway and  Denmark.

Gallery

References

1923 births
India MPs 1967–1970
Indian National Congress politicians from Puducherry
Lok Sabha members from Puducherry
1979 deaths
People from Pondicherry
Puducherry politicians
Indian National Congress (Organisation) politicians